The Wolf Prize in Mathematics is awarded almost annually by the Wolf Foundation in Israel. It is one of the six Wolf Prizes established by the Foundation and awarded since 1978; the others are in Agriculture, Chemistry, Medicine, Physics and Arts. According to a reputation survey conducted in 2013 and 2014, the Wolf Prize in Mathematics is the third most prestigious international academic award in mathematics, after the Abel Prize and the Fields Medal. Until the establishment of the Abel Prize, it was probably the closest equivalent of a "Nobel Prize in Mathematics", since the Fields Medal is awarded every four years only to mathematicians under the age of 40.

Laureates

Laureates per country 
Below is a chart of all laureates per country (updated to 2023 laureates). Some laureates are counted more than once if have multiple citizenship.

Notes

See also

 List of mathematics awards

References

External links 

 
 
 Israel-Wolf-Prizes 2015
 Jerusalempost Wolf Prizes 2017
 Jerusalempost Wolf Prizes 2018
 Wolf Prize 2019

Mathematics
Mathematics awards
Awards established in 1978
Lists of Israeli award winners
Israeli science and technology awards
1978 establishments in Israel